Timo Bichler (born 22 March 1999) is a German racing cyclist. In 2018, he won the bronze medal in the men's team sprint event at the 2018 UEC European Track Championships.

References

External links
 

1999 births
Living people
German male cyclists
Place of birth missing (living people)
Cyclists at the 2020 Summer Olympics
Olympic cyclists of Germany
People from Burghausen, Altötting
Sportspeople from Upper Bavaria